Maracanã, Pará is a municipality in the state of Pará in the Northern region of Brazil.

The municipality contains the lower reaches of the Maracanã River, which is joined by the Caripi River before widening into Maracanã Bay and emptying into the Atlantic Ocean beside Maiandeua Island.
The banks of the rivers are protected by the  Maracanã Marine Extractive Reserve, created in 2002.
The municipality contains the  Algodoal-Maiandeua Environmental Protection Area, created in 1990.

See also
List of municipalities in Pará

References

Municipalities in Pará